Shirakavan; founded as Yerazgavors and later Yerazgavork, was a medieval Armenian city and one of the 13 historic capitals of Armenia, serving as a capital city between 890 and 929 during the Bagratid Kingdom of Armenia.

The city was located on the right bank of Akhurian River to the northeast of Ani, corresponding with the current village of Çetindurak of Akyaka district of Kars Province, within the Republic of Turkey.

Early history
The earliest mentions of Shirakavan as a settlement appear as Yerazgavors in the 7th century, by the Armenian historian Sebeos. Yerazgavors was described by Sebeos as a village in the Shirak canton within the Ayrarat province of Armenia Major. It was later developed by king Smbat I of Armenia who moved the capital of Bagradit Armenia from Bagaran to Yerazgavors in 890, renaming it Shirakavan.

The church of Surp Prkich (Holy Saviour) built in the 880s by king Smbat I of Armenia, was among the notable landmarks of the city. Smbat was later crowned as king in the Surp Prkich Church by Catholicos George II of Armenia in 890. Shirakavan continued to serve as the capital of the kingdom until 929 when the city of Kars was chosen as capital by king Abas I of Armenia.

As described by the 11th and 12th century historians Stepanos Asoghik and Samuel Anetsi, Shirakavan had a central fortress surrounded with thick defensive city walls. Nonetheless, it was invaded by the Byzantines. Then in 1064, along with Ani, Shirakavan was destroyed by a large Seljuk Turkish army, headed by Sultan Alp Arslan.

By the end of the 12th century, Shirakavan was revived and rebuilt by the Zakarids. However, the city declined during the second half of the 13th century to become a regular village.

The 20th century

In 1914, prior to the Armenian genocide, Shirakavan was a quite large Armenian settlement with a population of 1220. After the Turkish–Armenian War of 1920, Shirakavan was abandoned and the Armenian population of the village moved to Eastern Armenia and settled in the newly-formed village of Yerazgavors. Later in 1921, the territory of Kars including Shirakavan, was officially handed over to the Turks by the Treaty of Kars.

The church of Surp Prkich was partly ruined by the beginning of the 20th century. After it was blown up by the Turks in 1954 during regular military training of the Turkish Army, only the western wall of the church survived. Other parts of ancient Shirakavan were flooded by the waters of a dam built on the Akhurian River.

References

External links
Shirakavan in virtualani.org

Former capitals of Armenia
Archaeological sites in Eastern Anatolia
Geography of Kars Province